Tales by Light is an Australian documentary reality television series airing on National Geographic. The program is branded content and a joint venture between National Geographic and Canon which follows a number of professional photographers travelling around the world to capture images which tell a story.

The program debuted on 24 May 2015 and was renewed for a second season which debuted on 25 October 2016. A third season premiered on Network Ten on 26 August 2018.

Cast
Art Wolfe (season 1)
Peter Eastway (season 1)
Richard I’Anson (season 1)
Darren Jew (season 1)
Krystle Wright (season 1)
Jonathan Scott (season 2)
Angela Scott (season 2)
Eric Cheng (season 2)
Stephen Dupont (season 2)
Simon Lister (season 3)
Shawn Heinrichs (season 3)
Dylan River (season 3)

Broadcast
In Australia, the first season of six half-hour episodes premiered on 24 May 2015 on National Geographic. The second season consisted of three hour-long episodes, and debuted on 25 October 2016. A third season moved to debut on Network Ten on 26 August 2018.

Internationally, the program became available via Netflix from 11 November 2016.

Episodes

Season 1 (2015)

Season 2 (2016)

Season 3 (2018)

References

External links

Australian non-fiction television series
English-language television shows
2015 Australian television series debuts
Documentary television series about art
National Geographic (American TV channel) original programming